Jack Glover may refer to:

 John Glover (footballer) (1876–1955), English footballer, known as Jack
 Jack Glover (artist) , an American artist